Bolotino is a rural locality (a selo) in Tukayevsky Selsoviet, Aurgazinsky District, Bashkortostan, Russia. The population was 281 as of 2010. There are 2 streets.

Geography 
Bolotino is located 28 km north of Tolbazy (the district's administrative centre) by road. Yakty-Yul is the nearest rural locality.

References 

Rural localities in Aurgazinsky District